Villepinte is a station on the RER B's Airport branch. The station is in Villepinte, a northern suburb of Paris, in Seine-Saint-Denis department, France. The station is in Zone 4 of the Carte orange.

References

External links

 

Railway stations in Seine-Saint-Denis
Réseau Express Régional stations